Ghislain Bagnon (born 24 December 1978) is a French former professional footballer.

Career
Born in Kokouezo, Gagnoa, Bagnon began playing club football in France with AS Cannes. He made his professional debut in Ligue 2 during 1998. He made 60 Ligue 2 appearances with Cannes before the club was relegated, and he played in the Championnat National for one further season. After he left Cannes, Bagnon had brief spells playing amateur football in England and in the Belgian Third Division with R.F.C. Tournai, before returning to play for ES Viry-Châtillon in 2003. He would finish his career playing amateur football in France with Marmande, CS Louhans-Cuiseaux and AS Cozes.

Bagnon won the 1997 UEFA European Under-18 Championship with France.

References

External links

1978 births
Living people
French footballers
France youth international footballers
Ligue 2 players
AS Cannes players
ES Viry-Châtillon players
Louhans-Cuiseaux FC players
People from Gôh-Djiboua District
Ivorian footballers
Association football defenders